Myoe Haung or Myohaung is a village in Kyain Seikgyi Township, Kawkareik District, in the Kayin State of Burma (Myanmar). It is on the Sadaw Marsh (Sadaw Chaung), eastern part of the foothills of the Tenasserim Range.

References

External links

"Myohaung Map — Satellite Images of Myohaung" Maplandia World Gazetteer

 
Populated places in Kayin State